Sir Joseph Augustine Ongley (5 February 1918 – 22 October 2000) was a New Zealand cricketer and lawyer. He was a judge of the New Zealand Supreme Court.

Early life
The son of Arthur "Joe" Ongley, he was born in Feilding and educated at St. Patrick's College, Silverstream, and Victoria College, Wellington, where he graduated Bachelor of Laws in 1939. A "correct, polished and dashing" batsman, he made his Hawke Cup debut for Manawatu at the age of 17 in 1935–36. He captained the team in its six matches in 1936–37 and 1937–38, when Manawatu, the champions, withstood five consecutive challenges.

First-class cricket career
Ongley made his first-class debut in 1938–39 for Wellington in the Plunket Shield, scoring a century in his first match against Otago. Batting first, at one stage Wellington were 116 for 5, but Ongley made 110, reaching his century in 149 minutes, and Wellington went on to win by an innings. He was selected to play for New Zealand later that season against Sir Julien Cahn's XI and made 35 as an opening batsman in a match ruined by rain.

He married Joan Archer in 1943. They had four sons and a daughter.

Ongley continued to play for Wellington, with moderate success, through the late 1940s, and captained the team from 1947–48 to 1949–50. He also continued to captain Manawatu in the Hawke Cup, including a period as title holders in the mid-1940s.

When the Central Districts team made its first appearance in the 1950–51 Plunket Shield, he was chosen to be captain. Central Districts finished second in 1950–51 and third in 1951–52, after which Ongley retired from first-class cricket. He continued to captain Manawatu until 1956–57, and played his last Hawke Cup match in 1957–58.

Later life
Ongley became the first-ever chairman of Central Districts Cricket Association, a position he held from 1954 to 1969. He managed the New Zealand cricket team in Australia in 1967–68.

Ongley was a judge of the New Zealand Supreme Court. He was made a Knight Bachelor in the 1987 Queen's Birthday Honours.

References

External links
 Joe Ongley at CricketArchive
 Joe Ongley at Cricinfo

1918 births
2000 deaths
New Zealand cricketers
Wellington cricketers
People educated at St. Patrick's College, Silverstream
Victoria University of Wellington alumni
Central Districts cricketers
20th-century New Zealand judges
High Court of New Zealand judges
People from Feilding
New Zealand cricket administrators
New Zealand Knights Bachelor
New Zealand Services cricketers